Uruguayan Carnival is a festival that takes place every year in Uruguay from mid January to late February. The Carnival draws root from candombe, Murga and tablados, which are forms of expression of Uruguayan culture through dance and music. From its conception, the Uruguayan Carnival has evolved into a dance parade in which different comparsas, groups of street performers in Latin American festivals, play the drums and dance at the "Desfile Inaugural del Carnaval" and "Desfile de Llamadas" parade. The biggest carnival celebrations are in the capital Montevideo and can last up to 40 days. They involve a series of cultural events such as dance parades in the streets, street stages called "tablados" and an artistic contest in the "Teatro de Verano" (Summer Theatre) in Montevideo.

History 

The Uruguayan Carnival finds its roots in the colonial period of Uruguayan culture, where the days of Carnival, Christmas, and New Year were celebrated by Montevideans in brightly-coloured robes with song and dance outside city walls. As the event attracted more attention, European carnival traditions began to influence the Carnival celebrations, especially through objects and traditions such as bran and flour shed, shed water syringes, throwing eggs, oranges, or other objects.

Festivities and music

The several festivities of the Carnival include theatrical-musical performances, street music and parades. Amongst these is Murga, a theatrical-musical genre that consists of a chorus of 14 to 17 people with murga drums. The themes of this musical theatre usually satirically portray the politics and society of Uruguay. Here, performers have their faces painted and are usually dressed in bright outfits. Lyrical content is based on a particular theme, chosen by the group, which serves to provide commentary on events in Uruguay or elsewhere over the preceding year. 

In addition, Escolas de Samba is also traditionally performed in the Carnival, principally in regions like Artigas and Montevideo. Utilising Brazilian percussion, dancers and a chorus of people, the performers sing the Samba Enredo.

References

External links
 Carnaval del Uruguay
 Portal de Murgas
 Historia de la Murga
 Carnaval del Futuro
 Carnaval de Montevideo: La mayor fiesta de la cultura y la participación popular
 Directores Asociados de Espectáculos Carnavalescos Populares de Uruguay
 Escola de Samba Imperatriz (Uruguay)

Afro-Uruguayan culture
Candombe
Masterpieces of the Oral and Intangible Heritage of Humanity
Carnivals in Uruguay
Summer events in Uruguay